Saagar is a 1985 Indian Hindi-language romantic drama film directed by Ramesh Sippy. The film stars Rishi Kapoor, Kamal Haasan and Dimple Kapadia. The film featured lyrics, story and screenplay written by Javed Akhtar and music by R. D. Burman. It received critical acclaim upon release, and winning four Filmfare Awards. This was the second instance in the history of Filmfare Awards where an actor has been nominated for both Best Actor as well as Best Actor in Supporting role, the previous nominee for both awards was Ashok Kumar (for Aashirwad in 1968). Kamal Haasan ultimately won the Best Actor award, his first and only award in that category for a Hindi film. Saagar was also a comeback film for Kapadia. Although this picture was the latter’s comeback film during the shoot, Zakhmi Sher (1984) (a remake of Telugu film, Bobbili Puli) became her second release in her acting career due to delayed and postponed dates of this particular movie. Saagar was India's official entry for the Academy Award for Best Foreign Language Film in 1985.

Plot 
Mona (Dimple Kapadia) runs a small restaurant in Goa. Raja (Kamal Haasan), who lives close by, is a good friend. He is in love with her but is unable to profess his feelings. Ravi (Rishi Kapoor) is from a rich industrialist family who moves to Goa from the US. Mona and Ravi fall in love of which Raja knows nothing of. Ravi's grandmother, Kamladevi (Madhur Jaffrey) is opposed to their love because of class differences. In the end Raja sacrifices his love for Mona and Ravi.

Cast 

Rishi Kapoor as Ravi
Kamal Haasan as Raja
Dimple Kapadia as Mona D'Silva
Nadira as Miss Joseph
Saeed Jaffrey as Mr. D'Silva
Madhur Jaffrey as Kamladevi, Ravi's grandmother
A. K. Hangal as Baba (in the lighthouse) 
Sharat Saxena as Tatya, fisherman
Shafi Inamdar as Vikram
Satish Kaushik as Batuk Laal
Kiran Vairale as Maria
Lilliput as Cheena
Goga Kapoor as Thekedaar
Balu Gaikwad as Bhikari

Soundtrack 

The music was composed by R. D. Burman and the lyrics were by Javed Akhtar. Kishore Kumar bagged his 8th Filmfare Award for the song "Sagar Kinare", Other singers include Lata Mangeshkar, Asha Bhosle, S. P. Balasubrahmanyam & Shailendra Singh.

R. D. Burman for song "Saagar Kinare" used one of his old song tune "Hume Raaston Ki Zaroorat Nahin Hai" from film Naram Garam released in 1981.

The song Jaane Do Na was recreated by composer Arko Pravo Mukherjee for the 2015 film Kuch Kuch Locha Hai.

The song Sach Mere Yaar Hai was reused in the 2021 TV Series The Family Man Season 2, as a tribute to the singer S. P. Balasubrahmanyam and to the fictional NIA agent character Millind in the series.

Release 
Saagar was released on 9 August 1985. Despite receiving critical acclaim, the movie was major box office failure. It gained recognition over the years through re-runs on television channels and is now regarded as a classic and a cult film. In 2015, Saagar was screened at the Habitat Film Festival.

Critical reception 
According to Asiaweek, "Saagar offers a skimpy eternal-triangle plot, but it is remarkable for its polished narration and masterly technique. The romance is subdued, symbolised by waves gently caressing the shore." It further praised the performances, calling Kapadia "a delight" and claiming that Hassan "steals the show with his subtle performance," and the direction by Sippy, who "has succeeded in injecting vitality, beauty and deep insight into a gossamer-thin story." India Today wrote, "Like Sholay, and only like Sholay, Saagar is purely a director's film."

Awards 
The film was chosen by India as its entry for the Best Foreign Language Film for the 58th Academy Awards, but was not nominated.

See also 
 List of submissions to the 58th Academy Awards for Best Foreign Language Film
 List of Indian submissions for the Academy Award for Best International Feature Film

References

External links 
 
 
 

1985 films
1980s Hindi-language films
Films directed by Ramesh Sippy
Films scored by R. D. Burman
Indian interfaith romance films